The Agusta A.104 Helicar was an Italian prototype light commercial helicopter first flown in December 1960.

Production
The A.104 was a slightly enlarged version of the A.103, and added a second seat beside the pilot's seat. The cockpit was enclosed by a perspex bubble with the engine at the rear and the tail rotor carried on an enclosed boom.

Two piston-engined prototypes were built, followed by a single example of a turbine-engined variant designated A.104BT. No production resulted.

Surviving aircraft
An example of the A.104 is preserved in the Museo Agusta which is maintained by the Agusta company and is located just south of Milan Malpensa Airport.

Variants
A.104 HelicarTwo prototype aircraft powered by de-rated Agusta GA.140 piston engines.
A.104BT HelicarA single example of a turbo-shaft powered Helicar, powered by a   Agusta A.270.

Specifications

See also

References

External links

 luftfahrt-archiv.de

Agusta aircraft
1960s Italian civil utility aircraft
1960s Italian helicopters
Aircraft first flown in 1960
Single-engined piston helicopters